Gudžiūnai (formerly) is a small town in Kėdainiai district, central Lithuania. It is located on the Dotnuvėlė River. The town has a Catholic Sacred Heart church, a secondary school, and a post office. There is also a train station (Gudžiūnai GS) just outside the town.

History
The name Gudžiūnai has been in use since at least 1653. The first church was built in 1812, and the current church was built in 1911. At the end of the 19th century Gudžiūnai became a town and from 1919 it was a volost center. During the Soviet era Gudžiūnai was a kolkhoz center.

Demography

Gallery

References

Kėdainiai District Municipality
Towns in Kaunas County